Markus Janka (born 21 March 1980 in Wolfratshausen) is a German professional ice hockey player who is currently an unrestricted free agent. He most recently played for Schwenninger Wild Wings in the Deutsche Eishockey Liga (German Ice Hockey League). Previously he has also played for the Kassel Huskies, Krefeld Pinguine, Straubing Tigers and ERC Ingolstadt.

References

External links
 

1980 births
Living people
ERC Ingolstadt players
German ice hockey goaltenders
Kassel Huskies players
Krefeld Pinguine players
People from Wolfratshausen
Sportspeople from Upper Bavaria
Schwenninger Wild Wings players
Straubing Tigers players